Development hell, also known as development purgatory or development limbo, is media and software industry jargon for a project, concept, or idea that remains in a stage of early development for a long time, because the project is stuck in legal, technical, or artistic challenges. A work may move between many sets of artistic leadership, crews, scripts, game engines, or studios. Many projects which end up in development hell never progress into production, and are gradually abandoned by the involved parties.

Projects in development hell generally have ambitious goals, which may or may not be underestimated in the design phase, and are delayed in an attempt to meet those goals to a high degree. Production hell refers to when a film has entered production but remains in that state for a long time without progressing to post-production.

The term can also apply generally to any project that has languished unexpectedly in its planning or construction phases, rather than being completed in a realistic amount of time, or otherwise having diverted from its original timely expected date of completion.

Overview

Film 
Film industry companies often buy the film rights to many popular novels, video games, and comic books, but it may take years for such properties to be successfully brought to the screen, and often with considerable changes to the plot, characters, and general tone. This pre-production process can last for months or years. More often than not, a project trapped in this state for a prolonged period of time will be abandoned by all interested parties or canceled outright. As Hollywood starts ten times as many projects as are released, many scripts will end up in this limbo state. Less than two percent of all books which are optioned actually make it to the big screen. 

Development hell happens most often with projects that have multiple interpretations and reflect several points of view. Development delays can also arise when a director and the film studio have a different vision about a film's casting, plot or budget, if a star withdraws from the project, or if there is turnover at the studio's executive level, and the new leaders have a different vision. Film projects can also be delayed if the film's topic becomes perceived as no longer marketable.

Production hell refers to when a film has entered production but remains in that state for a long time without progressing to post-production.

Television 
Television series can experience development hell between seasons, resulting in a long delay from one season to the next.

Video games 
Video game development can be stalled for years, occasionally over a decade, often due to a project being moved to different production studios, multiple iterations of the game being created and abandoned, or difficulties with the development of the game software itself.

Causes 
The concept artist and illustrator Sylvain Despretz has suggested that, "Development hell doesn't happen with no-name directors. It happens only with famous directors that a studio doesn't dare break up with. And that's how you end up for two years just, you know, polishing a turd. Until, finally, somebody walks away, at great cost."

With video games, slow progress and a lack of funds may lead developers to focus their resources elsewhere. Occasionally, completed portions of a game fail to meet expectations, with developers subsequently choosing to abandon the project rather than start from scratch. The commercial failure of a released game may also result in any prospective sequels being delayed or cancelled.

Turnaround deals 
If a film is in development but never receives the necessary production funds, another studio may execute a turnaround deal and successfully produce the film. For example, Columbia Pictures stopped production of E.T. the Extra-Terrestrial (1982). Universal Pictures then picked up the film and made it a success. When a studio completely abandons a film project, the costs are written off as part of the studio's overhead, thereby reducing taxable income.

See also 
 Design by committee
 Law of triviality
 List of media notable for being in development hell
 Scope creep
 Turnaround (filmmaking)
 Vaporware

References 

Film production
Video game development